Kabalega Hydroelectric Power Station, also known as Kabalega Power Station is a  mini hydroelectric power project located across River Wambabya, in Buseruka Sub County, Hoima District, in Western Uganda. At the beginning of planning and during construction, the power station was referred to as Buseruka Power Station, but was renamed after completion.

Location
The power station is located in Buseruka Village, close to the eastern shores of Lake Albert.

Construction costs
The initial estimated cost for the dam and power plant was approximately US$30 million. As time went on, that estimate was increased to US$36 million. Funding for the project is facilitated by loans from the African Development Bank (US$9 million) and from the PTA Bank (US$10 million).

Completion
Construction, which started in 2005, was completed in January 2013 and was commissioned by the president of Uganda, Yoweri Museveni, on 26 January 2013. At that time, the high voltage line which will evacuate the power generated to a substation that will integrate into the national grid, was yet to be completed.

See also

List of power stations in Uganda
List of hydropower stations in Africa
List of hydroelectric power stations

References

External links
Location of Kabalega Power Station At Google Maps
 About Buseruka Power Station
More About Buseruka Power Project
Project Design Document For Buseruka Power Station
About Hydromax

Energy infrastructure completed in 2013
Hydroelectric power stations in Uganda
Hoima District